Konar Sabz (also Romanized as Konār Sabz) is a village in Garmsar Rural District, Jebalbarez-e Jonubi District, Anbarabad County, Kerman Province, Iran. At the 2006 census, its population was 46, in 11 families.

References 

Populated places in Anbarabad County